Kilconickny is a civil parish in the county of Galway, Connaught, Ireland.

Location

It is mainly within the barony of Dunkellin, but parts are in the baronies of Athenry and Loughrea.
There is no bog in the parish.

The name in the Irish language is Cill C’nuicne, meaning Conicne's church.
The adjoining parishes are Bullaun, Kilchreest, Killeenadeema, Killogilleen, Kiltullagh, Lickerrig and Loughrea.
There are graveyards at Bookeen and Tooloobauntemple.

Historical

Nicholas Carlisle in the 1810 Topographical Dictionary of Ireland described the parish as:

As of 1837 the parish had  2,666 inhabitants.
According to Lewis's Topographical Dictionary of Ireland, 1837,

The Kilconickny Loan Fund was one of seven Irish Reproductive Loan Funds in County Galway.
It was a microcredit plan that provided small loans to the "industrious poor" in the parishes of Kilconierin, Lickerrig, and Kilconickny between 1838 and 1846.
Many of the loans in Kilconickny parish went into default during the Great Famine of 1845 to 1849, mostly due to death (38%), emigration (21%) or poverty (19%).

Kilconickny union

Records of the clergy of the parishes of Kilconickny union have survived from around 1398.   
The Anglican Kilconickny union was formed in 1735 when the vicarages of Kilconiran, Kiltullagh and Lickerigg were united.
In 1810 there was no church or glebe house in Kilconicky.
A church was built at Bookeen in 1815.
In 1834 there were 8,806 people in the union, of whom 130 belonged to the Anglican Church of Ireland.
Kilconickny union was united with Killinane union in 1906, and in 1933 the church at Bookeen was closed.
These were united with Loughrea in 1945.
As of 2020 they were part of Aughrim union in the diocese of Clonfert.

Clostoken & Kilconieran parish

The Catholic parish of Clostoken & Kilconieran has its origins in Isercleran (the hermitage of Cleran), which holds the ruins of an old church from the 8th or 9th century called Kilkisheen (the little Church of the Ford of the Hurdles).
The old church is near St. Cleran's House.
There were three ecclesiastical parishes in the Middle Ages; Kilconickny (now Clostoken), Kilconieran and Lickerrig (now Carrabane).
The three are now united in the large parish of Clostoken & Kilconieran.

Townlands

The townlands in the parish are:

Ardnadoman East
Ardnadoman West 
Ballingarry 
Ballybaun 
Ballynamucka 
Blackgarden 
Boherduff 
Bushfield 
Caherhenryhoe 
Cahernaman 
Cahernamona 
Cahernamuck East 
Cahernamuck West 
Cahertinny 
Carrowclogh 
Carrowmore 
Cloghastookeen 
Cloonoo East 
Cloonoo West 
Conicar 
Coorbaun 
Curraghroe 
Doogarraun 
Glenatallan 
Gortawullaun 
Gortnabarnaboy 
Gortsheela 
Kanargad 
Killaspugmoylan 
Kilmurry 
Knockadaumore 
Knockauncoura 
Knockroe 
Knockroebeg 
Lackafinna North 
Lackafinna South 
Lackalea 
Lurgan 
Monearmore 
Raheen Eighter 
Raheen Oughter 
Raruddy East 
Raruddy West 
Srah 
Tonbaun 
Tooloobauntemple

Notes

Sources

Civil parishes of County Galway